Eric John Mitchell (15 May 1911 – 17 May 1963) was an Australian rules footballer who played with Hawthorn in the Victorian Football League (VFL).

Notes

External links 

1911 births
1963 deaths
Australian rules footballers from Melbourne
Hawthorn Football Club players
People from Collingwood, Victoria